Sothis is an EP by the Polish death metal band Vader. It was released in 1994 by Baron Records. Tracks 2 and 4 appear on their next release, De Profundis, and track 7 appears on Vader's tribute album Future of the Past.

Track listing

Personnel 
Production and performance credits are adapted from the album liner notes.

Release history

References 

1994 EPs
Vader (band) albums
Metal Mind Productions albums